The Sound of a Million Dreams is the second studio album by American country music artist David Nail. It was released on November 15, 2011 via MCA Nashville.

Content
The album includes the number one single "Let It Rain", which features Sarah Buxton on backing vocals, and the title track, which peaked at number 38 on the country music charts.

"Grandpa's Farm" was also recorded by Frankie Ballard on his 2011 self-titled album, and "Desiree" by The Ranch, a band fronted by Keith Urban, on their 1997 self-titled debut. Dave Haywood and Charles Kelley of Lady Antebellum co-wrote the track "I Thought You Knew".

Critical reception

Thom Jurek of Allmusic rated the album 3.5 out of 5 stars, saying that "Musically and sonically it's well above average, even if there are three generic cuts in the middle that keep it from rising to the next level."

Track listing

Personnel
 Sarah Buxton – background vocals on "Let It Rain"
 Madison Cain – background vocals
 Chris Carmichael – strings
 Joanna Cotten – background vocals
 Dan Dugmore – acoustic guitar, steel guitar
 Fred Eltringham – drums, percussion
 Mike Henderson – background vocals
 Will Hoge – background vocals on "Catherine"
 Randy Leago – sitar
 Chuck Leavell – Hammond B-3 organ, piano, Wurlitzer
 Hillary Lindsey – background vocals
 George Marinelli Jr. – electric guitar
 David Nail – lead vocals
 Kim Parent – background vocals
 Doug Pettibone – electric guitar
 Jon Randall – background vocals
 Jeff Roach – Hammond B-3 organ, keyboards, mellotron, synthesizer, synthesizer piano
 Chris Rodriguez – background vocals
 Daniel Tashien – background vocals
 Ilya Toshinsky – bouzouki, acoustic guitar, electric guitar, national steel guitar
 Lee Ann Womack – background vocals on "Songs for Sale"
 Glenn Worf – bass guitar

Chart performance
The album debuted at No. 50 on the Billboard 200 (No. 44 on the Top Current Albums chart), and No. 8 on the Top Country Albums chart with 13,000 copies sold for the week.

Weekly charts

Year-end charts

Singles

References

2011 albums
David Nail albums
MCA Records albums
Albums produced by Chuck Ainlay
Albums produced by Frank Liddell